Cotachena taiwanalis is a moth in the family Crambidae. It was described by Hiroshi Yamanaka in 2001. It is found in Taiwan and Korea.

References

Moths described in 2001
Spilomelinae